The 1881 Massachusetts gubernatorial election was held on November 8.

Governor

Lt. Governor

See also
 1881 Massachusetts legislature

References

Governor
1881
Massachusetts
November 1881 events